is a Japanese politician of the Liberal Democratic Party (LDP), a former member of the House of Representatives in the Diet (national legislature). A native of Niihari District, Ibaraki and graduate of Keio University he was elected for the first time in 1979 after working as a writer for Yomiuri Shimbun. Later, he served as the Minister of Health in 1992 and in 1999.

He was defeated by Democratic Party of Japan (DPJ)-backed candidate Hiroko Ōizumi（former Lieutenant Governor of Yamaguchi Prefecture）in the Japanese general election, 2009.

References

External links 
 Official website in Japanese.

|-

|-

|-

|-

1944 births
Living people
Politicians from Ibaraki Prefecture
Keio University alumni
Members of the House of Representatives (Japan)
Government ministers of Japan
Liberal Democratic Party (Japan) politicians
21st-century Japanese politicians